Dihydrokaempferide is a flavanonol, a type of flavonoid. It can be found in Prunus domestica (plum tree), in the wood of Salix caprea (goat willow) and in the Brazilian green propolis.

References 

O-methylated flavanonols
Resorcinols